Scurry may refer to:

People
 Briana Scurry (b. 1971), American soccer player
 Carey Scurry (b. 1962), American basketball player
 James Scurry (1766–1822), English soldier and memoirist
 Moses Scurry (b. 1968), American basketball player
 Richardson A. Scurry (1811–1862), American politician
 Rod Scurry (1956–1992), American baseball player
 William Scurry (1895–1962), Australian soldier
 William Read Scurry (1821–1864), Confederate general in the American Civil War

Places
 Scurry, Texas, U.S.
 Scurry County, Texas, U.S.

Other
 Holden Scurry, an alternate name of the Suzuki Carry
 Scurry driving, an equestrian sport
 Scurry Gold Cup, a greyhound race in England
 Scurry Stakes, a flat horse race in England
 USS Scurry (AM-304), a minesweeper
Scurry, a webcomic by Mac Smith

See also